The Calcutta Review is a bi-annual periodical, now published by the Calcutta University press, featuring scholarly articles from a variety of disciplines.

History

The Calcutta Review was founded in May 1844, by Sir John William Kaye and Reverend Alexander Duff. Through the journal, Sir John Kaye aimed "to bring together such useful information, and propagate such sound opinions, relating to Indian affairs, as will, it is hoped, conduce, in some small measure, directly or indirectly, to the amelioration of the condition of the people".

The periodical proved to be successful, and was published as a quarterly up until 1912. Sir John Kaye was Editor of four issues, and then retired due to ill health. He remained the owner of the review until 1855, when it was purchased by Meredith Townsend. Thacker, Spink and Company bought it in 1857. It was printed by Sanders and Cowes until 1857, when it moved to the Serampore Press. When Rev. T. Ridsdale took over as editor, it was published by R. C. Lepage and Company.

The journal was not published in 1912. In its second series, from 1913 to 1920, it was published bi-annually. In 1921, it was acquired by the Calcutta University press, which now releases it bi-annually.

Early editors
 Sir John William Kaye (1844–1845)
 Reverend Dr. Alexander Duff (1845–1849)
 Reverend W. S. Mackay (1849–1852)
 Reverend Thomas Smith (1852–1855, 1857)
 George Smith (1855–1856, 1857-1864)
 Meredith Townsend (1856–1857)
 Sir Alfred Swaine Lethbridge (1871-1878)
 James W. Furrell (1879-1884, 1894-1902)
 Sir Richard Temple
 Reverend T. Ridsdale

References

Further reading

External links
 The Calcutta Review documentation project, by the English Department, Calcutta University (archived 30 November 2016)
 Scanned issues

1844 establishments in British India
English-language magazines published in India
Literary magazines published in India
Magazines established in 1844
Mass media in Kolkata
University of Calcutta
Biannual magazines published in India